Tell Me a Riddle is a 1980 American drama film directed by actress Lee Grant. The screenplay by Joyce Eliason and Alev Lytle is based on the 1961 O. Henry Award novella from Tillie Olsen's collection of short stories of the same name. Tell Me a Riddle was Grant's first film as director.

Synopsis
Eva and David are an elderly, bitter Jewish emigre couple who raised children in poverty in the Midwest. When David is told Eva is dying of cancer and must not know, he takes her on a journey to visit their children across the United States. In San Francisco, Eva draws inspiration from their exuberant granddaughter Jeannie, who lives life to the fullest despite any stumbling blocks it may toss in her path. To her she reveals the secrets of her soul and shares with her clippings and photos of the literary and philosophical greats – Walt Whitman and Émile Zola among them – who have sustained her in her bleakest moments and offered her promise of a better life. As Eva comes to terms with her past, and David relives their years as revolutionaries, she and David manage to recapture the love they felt for each other early in their marriage.

The film was revolutionary in its creation and subsequent cultural impact. It was the first feature film in America to be written, produced and directed by women; the first women's film to raise more than one million dollars and to receive major studio distribution; and, the first women's film to screen during the Cannes Film Festival's "Directors' Fortnight". The film won Best Picture and Best Actor at the Edinburgh Film Festival and Best Actress Award at the Taormina Film Fest in Italy.

Principal cast
 Melvyn Douglas as David
 Lila Kedrova as Eva
 Brooke Adams as Jeannie
 Peter Coyote as Young D
 Nora Heflin as Young Eva
 Zalman King as Paul

Critical reception
In her review in The New York Times, Janet Maslin called the film "a slow, restrained, dignified effort ... so straightforward and so simple that it doesn't prompt anything more elaborate than subjective reactions. If you bring the right sad baggage to it, you may be deeply moved; if you resent being manipulated, you may be moved in quite another direction. Throughout the film, plain competence and good intentions are on display, and at least in this case, they aren't qualities that make for strong responses. This may be a movie to remind you of something. But I don't think it's one to touch you on its own."

References

External links

 

1980 films
1980 drama films
American drama films
Films based on short fiction
Films set in San Francisco
Films directed by Lee Grant
1980 directorial debut films
Filmways films
American Playhouse
1980s English-language films
1980s American films